Ratnanagar is a municipality in Chitwan District of Bagmati Province in Nepal. It is the second biggest municipality after Bharatpur Metropolitan City that was formed in 1997 through the merger of the former Village Development Committees Old-Ratnanagar and Panchakanya. It is adjacent to Chitwan National Park, and serves as a gateway to the  park. Agricultural products produced from Ratnanagar includes rice, maize, mustard and vegetables. This municipality is also a major place for production of poultry products and animal husbandry. Tourism is another source of income generation for the people in Ratnanagar. People are directly or indirectly dependent in tourism industry. Ratnanagar is also concerned in environment preservation so in order to preserve and protect environment, eco-friendly electric risk-shaw has also been introduced and available in different parts of this municipality.
It lies on the bank of East Rapti River.

In 2014, the former Village Development Committees Bachhayauli and Pithuwa were merged into Ratnanagar.

Sauraha that lies in Ratnanagar's vicinity is a touristic hub with many hotels, resorts and shops, as it borders Chitwan National Park. There is also an Elephant Breeding Station.

Demographics
At the time of the 2011 Nepal census, Ratnanagar Municipality had a population of 70,226. Of these, 70.2% spoke Nepali, 16.6% Tharu, 3.9% Tamang, 2.6% Bhojpuri, 1.6% Newar, 1.2% Darai, 0.9% Gurung, 0.7% Magar, 0.7% Hindi, 0.6% Maithili, 0.3% Chepang, 0.1% Urdu, 0.1% Bote, 0.1% Rai, 0.1% Kumal and 0.1% other languages as their first language.

In terms of ethnicity/caste, 33.1% were Hill Brahmin, 17.7% Tharu, 12.4% Chhetri, 6.7% Tamang, 6.4% Newar, 3.4% Kami, 2.9% Gurung, 2.9% Magar, 2.5% Musalman, 1.7% Damai/Dholi, 1.4% Sarki, 1.3% Darai, 1.2% Kumal, 1.1% Sanyasi/Dasnami, 0.7% Gharti/Bhujel, 0.5% Chepang, 0.5% Thakuri, 0.4% Kalwar, 0.3% Musahar, 0.3% Rai, 0.2% Badi, 0.2% Bote, 0.2% Teli, 0.1% Hajam/Thakur, 0.1% Kanu, 0.1% Majhi, 0.1% Mali, 0.1% Mallaha, 0.1% Terai Brahmin, 0.1% Kurmi, 0.1% Dusadh/Pasawan/Pasi, 0.1% Koiri/Kushwaha, 0.1% Sunuwar, 0.1% Halwai, 0.1% Kathabaniyan, 0.1% other Dalit, 0.1% Yadav and 0.1% others.

In terms of religion, 87.9% were Hindu, 7.2% Buddhist, 2.5% Muslim, 2.0% Christian, 0.1% Prakriti and 0.2% others.

Transportation 
Ratnanagar lies on Mahendra Highway, one of the main highways in Nepal.

Media 
To Promote local culture and cast local news Ratnanagar has three community radio stations, Radio Arpan - 104.5 MHz, Radio Chitwan 94.6 MHz and  Relation F.M

See also
 Sauraha

References

Populated places in Chitwan District
Village development committees (Nepal)
Nepal municipalities established in 1997